is a law firm in Japan.

The firm was founded in 2002 by the merger of Mori Sogo Law Offices and Hamada & Matsumoto. Mori Sogo Law Offices was founded in 1949. It opened offices in Singapore and Yangon.

Offices

Mori Hamada's main office is in the Marunouchi Park Building in Tokyo. It has domestic branch offices in Fukuoka, Nagoya and Osaka, and overseas offices in Beijing, Shanghai, Singapore and Yangon.

References

External links 
 

Law firms of Japan
Law firms established in 2002
2002 establishments in Japan